Europe Tour is a 1992 album by Canadian singer Roch Voisine containing some of his best live performances in Europe with 22 of his hits, 18 in French and 4 in English. The album was successful on the chart.

In France, the album spawned a sole single : "La légende Oochigeas", which was released in live version and hit number four on the singles chart and remained in the top 50 for 20 weeks.

Europe Tour debuted at #15 on 21 October 1992 on the SNEP Albums Chart and had a peak at number two seven weeks later. It totaled ten weeks in the top ten and 20 weeks in the top 50. In 1993, the album was certified Platinum disc for over 300,000 copies sold.

Track listing
English language songs marked with **

Disc 1
 Ouverture IV" (instrumental) — 2:06
 Là-bas dans l'ombre" (Voisine, Lefèvre / Katz) — 2:07
 Fille de pluie" (Voisine, Huet / Voisine) — 1:26
 Ton blues" (Voisine, Marc Voisine, Lefèvre / Sperenza) — 2:18
 La promesse" (Lefebvre, Voisine) — 2:41
 All Wired Up" ** (Voisine) — 4:06 
 Prélude" — 1:19
 Les Jardins de St-Martin (Princesse)" (Voisine) — 3:19
 Souviens-toi" (Voisine) — 3:31
 La légende Oochigeas" (Voisine, Campbell) — 6:16
 Until Death Do Us Part" ** (Francis Cabrel, Campbell, Voisine) — 3:38 
 Avec tes yeux pretty face" (Voisine) — 3:32
 L'idole" (Voisine) — 4:19

Disc 2
 "La Berceuse du petit diable" (Decary, Voisine) — 4:34
 "Waiting" ** (Voisine) — 3:32
 "Darlin'" (Ciciola, Decary, Izzo, Voisine) — 4:19
 "Avant de partir" (Décarie / Gauthier) — 2:54
 "On the Outside" ** (Campbell, Voisine) — 4:44
 "Pourtant" (Voisine, Lefèvre / Voisine) — 7:21
 "Hélène"  (Voisine, Lessard / Voisine) — 6:24
 "Tous les soirs c'est Saturday" (Voisine / Voisine, Price) — 6:11
 "Bye Bye" (Lefebcre, Voisine, Vollant) — 4:55

Personnel
 Paul Vincent - management
 Marc Beaulieu - musical director, vocals
 Peter Barbeau - drums
 Kevin De Souza - bass
 Rejean Lachance - guitar
 Christian Peloquin, James Campbell - guitar, vocals
 Claude Castonguay - keyboards
 Paul Picard - percussion
 Deborah Cox, Luce Duffault, Kim Richardson - vocals
 Michael Delaney - mixing
 René Weis, Luc Pellerin, Jean Massicott, Bill Kinal - mixing assistants
 Nuit de Chine - design
 François Darmigny / Sygma - photos
 Roch Voisine, André Di Cesare - producer

References

External links
Roch Voisine Official site album page

Roch Voisine albums
1992 live albums